The women's team sprint competition at the 2018 UCI Track Cycling World Championships was held on 28 February 2018.

Results

Qualifying
The eight fastest teams advance to the first round.

First round
First round heats were held as follows:
Heat 1: 4th v 5th fastest
Heat 2: 3rd v 6th fastest
Heat 3: 2nd v 7th fastest
Heat 4: 1st v 8th fastest

The heat winners were ranked on time, from which the top 2 proceeded to the gold medal final and the other 2 proceeded to the bronze medal final.

 QG = qualified for gold medal final
 QB = qualified for bronze medal final

Finals
The final classification was decided in the medal finals.

References

Women's team sprint
UCI Track Cycling World Championships – Women's team sprint